Eltham Hill School is a secondary school for girls and a mixed sixth form located in the Eltham area of the Royal Borough of Greenwich in London, England.

History

Grammar school
The school was founded as Eltham Hill Grammar School for Girls.

Comprehensive
A comprehensive education system was adopted in Greenwich Borough, with the school becoming comprehensive in 1974. The school became a specialist Technology College for a time and was renamed Eltham Hill Technology College, before the Eltham Hill School name was readopted. Today, it is a community school administered by Greenwich London Borough Council.

Eltham Hill School offers GCSEs and BTECs as programmes of study for pupils. Students in the sixth form have the option of studying from a range of A Levels, the International Baccalaureate and the IBCP.

Notable former pupils

Eltham Hill Grammar School for Girls
 Sara Coward, actress who played Caroline Sterling/Pemberton/Bone in The Archers
 Anne Dudley, composer of film scores, music producer and arranger, played with the Art of Noise
 Bernardine Evaristo MBE, FRSL, FRSA, FEA, FRBC, Ph.DD, writer and Professor of Creative Writing, Brunel University London
 Trudie Goodwin, actress in The Bill
 Sheila Noakes, Baroness Noakes, Conservative politician and former corporate executive
 Edith Summerskill, physician, feminist, Labour MP from 1938-55 for Fulham West, and from 1955-61 for Warrington, Minister of National Insurance from February 1950 to October 1951
 Ruth Williams Khama, was the wife of Botswana's first president Sir Seretse Khama; she served as the inaugural First Lady of Botswana from 1966 to 1980.

References

External links
 Eltham Hill School official website

Educational institutions with year of establishment missing
Community schools in the Royal Borough of Greenwich
Buildings and structures in Eltham
Girls' schools in London
International Baccalaureate schools in England
Secondary schools in the Royal Borough of Greenwich